Morini may refer to:

People 
 Alfonsina Morini (1891-1959), Italian cyclist
 Alfonso Morini, the founder of Moto Morini
 Emanuele Morini (born 1982), Italian football player
 Erika Morini (1904–1995), Austrian violinist
 Francesco Morini (1944–2021), Italian football player
 Gian Franco Morini (born 1984), Italian music video and film director, film editor and writer
 Giorgio Morini (born 1947), Italian midfielder
 Giovanni Morini (born 1995), Italian ice hockey player
 Guido Morini (born 1959), Italian pianist, organist, harpsichordist, musicologist and composer
 Massimo Morini, driver in the 2008 FIA GT Championship

Biology 
 Agdistis morini, a moth in the family Pterophoridae
 Ecyroschema morini, a species of beetle in the family Cerambycidae
 Elattoneura morini, a damselfly species in the genus Elattoneura
 Euphaedra morini , a butterfly in the family Nymphalidae
 Homelix morini, a species of beetle in the family Cerambycidae
 Platypodia morini, a crab species in the genus Platypodia

Other uses
 Morini, an ancient Belgic tribe
 Morini (manufacturer), a Swiss (previously Italian) manufacturer of target pistols
 Moto Morini, Italian maker of motorcycles

See also 
 Morin (disambiguation)
 Moreno (disambiguation)

Italian-language surnames